Charlie Dopékoulouyen (born 2 January 1991 in Mobaye) is a Central African footballer who plays as a forward for Raja Casablanca and the Central African Republic.

References

1986 births
Living people
Central African Republic footballers
Central African Republic international footballers
Central African Republic expatriate footballers
People from Basse-Kotto
Association football forwards